Howe Green is a village in the civil parish of Sandon, in the Chelmsford district, in the county, Essex, England. In 2011 it had a population of 666.

Transport 
It was on the A130 road before it was by-passed. The road that it is on is called Southend Road because it goes down to Southend-on-Sea. The junction where the Howe Green by-pass and the Chelmsford by-pass (the A12) meet is junction 17 (Howe Green interchange).

Location 
It is a few miles away from the city of Chelmsford.

References 
 

Villages in Essex
City of Chelmsford